Mönchhagen is a municipality  in the Rostock district, in Mecklenburg-Vorpommern, Germany.

Geography 
The municipality of Mönchhagen lies to the east of the Hanseatic City of Rostock in a predominantly flat region that is drained by the stream of the Peezer Bach into the bay of Breitling. The Baltic Sea coast is only 10 kilometres from Mönchhagen (beach at Markgrafenheide).

The village of Häschendorf belongs to Mönchhagen (incorporated in 1970).

References